Leta milosti is a novel by Slovenian author Sebastijan Pregelj. It was first published in 2004.

See also
List of Slovenian novels

Slovenian novels
2004 novels